According to the Bible, the Tribe of Gad was one of the Twelve Tribes of Israel who, after the Exodus from Egypt, settled on the eastern side of the Jordan River. It is one of the ten lost tribes. The Tribe of Gad still originated from the original Hebrew Israelites.

Biblical narrative 

After the conquest of the land by Joshua until the formation of the first Kingdom of Israel in  1050 BC, the Tribe of Gad was a part of a loose confederation of Israelite tribes. No central government existed, and in times of crisis the people were led by ad hoc leaders known as Judges (see the Book of Judges). Nahash appears abruptly as the attacker of Jabesh-Gilead, which lay outside the territory he laid claim to. Having subjected the occupants to a siege, the population sought terms for surrender, and were told by Nahash that they had a choice of death (by the sword) or having their right eyes gouged out. The population obtained seven days' grace from Nahash, during which they would be allowed to seek help from the Israelites, after which they would have to submit to the terms of surrender. The occupants sought help from the people of Israel, sending messengers throughout the whole territory, and Saul, a herdsman at this time, responded by raising an army which decisively defeated Nahash and his cohorts at Bezek.

The strangely cruel terms given by Nahash for surrender were explained by Josephus as being the usual practice of Nahash. A more complete explanation came to light with the discovery of the Dead Sea Scrolls: although not present in either the Septuagint or masoretic text, an introductory passage, preceding this narrative, was found in a copy of the Books of Samuel among the scrolls found in cave 4:

With the growth of the threat from Philistine incursions, the Israelite tribes decided to form a strong centralised monarchy to meet the challenge, and the Tribe of Gad joined the new kingdom with Saul as the first king. After the death of Saul, all the tribes other than Judah remained loyal to the House of Saul, but after the death of Saul's son Ish-bosheth, successor to the throne of Israel, the Tribe of Gad joined the other northern Israelite tribes in making Judah's king David the king of a re-united Kingdom of Israel. However, on the accession of David's grandson Rehoboam, in c. 930 BC the northern tribes split from the House of David and from Saul's tribe Benjamin to reform Israel as the Northern Kingdom. Gad was a member of the Northern Kingdom until the kingdom was conquered by Assyria in c. 723 BC and the population deported.

From that time onwards, the Tribe of Gad has been counted as one of the Ten Lost Tribes of Israel.

Gad is also mentioned in the Mesha Stele: " And the men of Gad lived in the land of Ataroth from ancient times, and the king of Israel built Ataroth for himself, and I fought against the city, and I captured it, and I killed all the people from the city as a sacrifice for Kemoš and for Moab, and I brought back the fire-hearth of his uncle from there, and I hauled it before the face of Kemoš in Kerioth, and I made the men of Sharon live there, as well as the men of Maharith."

Tribal territory

Following the completion of the conquest of Canaan by the Israelite tribes after about 1200 BCE, Joshua allocated the land among the twelve tribes. However, in the case of the Tribes of Gad, Reuben and half of Manasseh, Moses allocated land to them on the eastern side of the Jordan River and the Dead Sea. The Tribe of Gad was allocated the central region of the three, east of Ephraim and West Manasseh, though the exact location is ambiguous.

"The border was Jazer, and all the cities of Gilead, and half the land of the children of Ammon, unto Aroer that is before Rabbah; and from Heshbon unto Ramath-mizpeh, and Betonim; and from Mahanaim unto the border of Lidbir and in the valley, Beth-haram, and Beth-nimrah, and Succoth, and Zaphon, the rest of the kingdom of Sihon king of Heshbon, the Jordan being the border thereof, unto the uttermost part of the sea of Chinnereth beyond the Jordan eastward."

The location was never secure from invasion and attacks, since to the south it was exposed to the Moabites, and like the other tribes east of the Jordan was exposed on the north and east to Aram-Damascus and later the Assyrians.

Origin
According to the Torah, the tribe consisted of descendants of Gad the seventh son of Jacob, from whom it took its name. However, some Biblical scholars view this also as a postdiction, an eponymous metaphor providing an aetiology of the connectedness of the tribe to others in the Israelite confederation. In the Biblical account, Gad is one of the two descendants of Zilpah, a handmaid of Jacob, the other descendant being Asher; scholars see this as indicating that the authors saw Gad and Asher as being not of entirely Israelite origin (hence descendants of handmaids rather than of full wives). In common with Asher is the possibility that the tribal name derives from a deity worshipped by the tribe, Gad being thought by scholars to be likely to have taken its name from Gad, the semitic god of fortune;

Like Asher, Gad's geographic details are diverse and divergent, with cities sometimes indicated as being part of Gad, and sometimes as part of other tribes, and with inconsistent boundaries, with Gilead sometimes including Gad and sometimes not. Furthermore, the Moabite Stone seemingly differentiates between the kingdom of Israel and the tribe of Gad, saying "the men of Gad dwelled in the country of Ataroth from ancient times, and the king of Israel fortified Ataroth", implicitly presenting Gad as predating Israel in the lands east of the Jordan. These details seems to indicate that Gad was originally a northwards-migrating nomadic tribe, at a time when the other tribes were quite settled in Canaan.

In the biblical account, Gad's presence on the east of the Jordan is explained as a matter of the tribe desiring the land as soon as they saw it, before they had even crossed the Jordan under Joshua, and conquered Canaan. Classical rabbinical literature regards this selection of the other side by Gad as something for which they should be blamed, remarking that, as mentioned in Ecclesiastes, the full stomach of the rich denies them sleep. When they arrived at the Jordan and saw the fertility of the land, they said: "One handful of enjoyment on this side is better than two on the other" (Lev. R. 3:1). However, because they crossed the river to help their brethren in the conquest of Palestine, just as Simeon did when he took his sword and warred against the men of Shechem, they were found worthy to follow the tribe of Simeon at the sacrifices on the occasion of the dedication of the Tabernacle (Num. R. 13. 19). Moses was buried in the territory of Gad (Sotah 13b; Yalkut Shimoni, Vezot Habrachah, sec. 961). According to some, Elijah was a descendant of Gad (Gen. R. 71). The tribes of Gad and Reuben were the first that went into exile (Lam. R. 1:5).

Family tree

Fate 

Though initially forming part of the Kingdom of Israel, from the biblical account it appears that under Uzziah and Jotham the tribe of Gad joined with the kingdom of Judah instead. Nevertheless, when Tiglath-Pileser III annexed the kingdom of Israel in about 733-731 BC, Gad also fell victim to the actions of the Assyrians, and the tribe were exiled; in the Talmud, it is Gad, along with the tribe of Reuben, that are portrayed as being the first victims of this fate. The manner of the exile led to the further history of the tribe being lost, and according to the Book of Jeremiah, their former lands were (re)conquered by the Ammonites.

This tribe was probably very detached from the other tribes, remaining just like Reuben mostly a nomadic tribe of herders. No person of it is ever mentioned by name after the conquest, it is not included in the list of tribes in II Chronicles 27 and it is not mentioned in the song of Deborah, other detached tribes like Reuben and Asher at least being mentioned as missing in the battle. The cities mentioned are often also shown as part of other tribes (as part of Manasseh in the North and of Reuben in the south). So Gad's borders are not well defined and probably shifted over time towards the north as pressure from Moab and Ammon increased. Unlike Reuben, however, it is mentioned on the Mesha Stele and so there is definite proof of it still being around as a recognizable entity in the mid-9th century.

Ethiopian Jews, also known as Beta Israel, claim descent from the Tribe of Dan, whose members migrated south along with members of the tribes of Gad, Asher, and Naphtali, into the Kingdom of Kush, now Ethiopia and Sudan, during the destruction of the First Temple. The Igbo in Nigeria claim descent from Gad through his son Eri, also the name of their first king.

See also
Gad (son of Jacob)
Gad (deity)

References

External links
Map of Gad Tribal territory, 1650. Thomas Fuller. Eran Laor Cartographic Collection, The National Library of Israel.

Gad, Tribe of
Gad
Gilead